Brooklyn Community Board 17 is a New York City community board that encompasses the Brooklyn neighborhoods of East Flatbush, Remsen Village, Farragut, Rugby, Erasmus and Ditmas Village. The District is delimited by East 32nd Street, Glenwood Road, Nostrand Avenue, Foster Avenue, and Bedford Avenue on the west, Clarkson Avenue, Utica Avenue, and East New York Avenue on the north, East 98th Street on the east, as well as by the Long Island Rail Road on the south.

The board's current chairman is Rodrick Daley, and the District Manager is Sherif Fraser.

As of the United States Census, 2020, District 17 has a population of 133,144, down from 165,753 in 2000 and 161,261 in 1990. 
Of them (as of 2020), 84.0% are African-American, 3.0% are White non Hispanic, 1.0% Asian or Pacific Islander, 0.5% of some other race, 3% of two or more races,(7.0%) of Hispanic origins.
Approximately 50% of the population is foreign-born.

References

External links
Profile of the Community Board (PDF)
Brooklyn neighborhood map
https://censusreporter.org/profiles/79500US3604010-nyc-brooklyn-community-district-17-east-flatbush-farragut-rugby-puma-ny/

East Flatbush, Brooklyn